The 1978 Cork Senior Football Championship was the 90th staging of the Cork Senior Football Championship since its establishment by the Cork County Board in 1887. The championship began on 9 April 1978 and ended on 17 September 1978. It was the first championship to use a group stage format followed by a knockout phase.

Nemo Rangers entered the championship as the defending champions.

On 17 September 1978, Nemo Rangers won the championship following a 1-09 to 1-03 defeat of St Michael's in the final. This was their fifth championship title overall and their second title in succession. It was the first time that two teams had qualified for the final having earlier lost a match. St. Michael's became the first team since Fermoy in 1944 to lose three finals in-a-row.

Dinny Allen was the championship's top scorer with 2-36.

Format change

Since its inception in 1887 the championship had been played on a straight knock-out basis. If any team was defeated at any stage it meant automatic elimination. This system was deemed the fairest as the county champions would always be the team who won all of their games. There were some problems with this system and a special committee was established to examine the standard of competing teams. At the County Convention on 5 February 1978, delegates voted by 138 to 83 in favour of changing the format of the championship. The new format incorporated a group stage involving four different divisions followed by a knockout stage.

Team changes

To Championship

Promoted from the Cork Intermediate Football Championship
 Naomh Abán

From Championship

Declined to field a team
 Imokilly

Results

Division 1

Table

{| class="wikitable" style="text-align:center"
!width=20|
!width=150 style="text-align:left;"|Team
!width=20|
!width=20|
!width=20|
!width=20|
!width=40|
!width=40|
!width=20|
!width=20|
|- style="background:#ccffcc"
|1||align=left| St. Finbarr's ||4||4||0||0||7-30||2-33||12||8
|- style="background:#FFFFE0" 
|2||align=left| Nemo Rangers ||4||3||0||1||11-45||3-21||48||6
|- style="background:#FFFFE0" 
|3||align=left| St Michael's ||4||2||0||2||8-30||6-32||4||4
|- 
|4||align=left| St. Nicholas' ||4||1||0||3||3-25||14-30||-38||2
|- 
|5||align=left| UCC ||4||0||0||4||6-25||10-39||-26||0
|-|align=left|
|colspan="10" style="border:0px;font-size:85%;"| Green background The top-placed team qualified for the semi-final stage of the championship proper.Yellow background The second and third-placed teams qualified for the quarter-final stage of the championship proper.
|}

Results

Division 2

Table

{| class="wikitable" style="text-align:center"
!width=20|
!width=150 style="text-align:left;"|Team
!width=20|
!width=20|
!width=20|
!width=20|
!width=30|
!width=30|
!width=20|
!width=20|
|- style="background:#FFFFE0" 
|1||align=left| Clonakilty ||3||2||0||1||6-28||4-23||11||4
|- style="background:#FFFFE0" 
|2||align=left| Millstreet ||3||2||0||1||4-31||4-26||5||4
|- 
|3||align=left| Bishopstown ||3||2||0||1||3-24||3-26||-2||4 
|-
|4||align=left| Dohenys ||3||0||0||3||5-13||9-31||-30||0
|-|align=left|
|colspan="10" style="border:0px;font-size:85%;"| Yellow background The first and second-placed teams qualified for the quarter-final stage of the championship proper.
|}

Results

Playoff

Division 3

Table

{| class="wikitable" style="text-align:center"
!width=20|
!width=150 style="text-align:left;"|Team
!width=20|
!width=20|
!width=20|
!width=20|
!width=30|
!width=30|
!width=20|
!width=20|
|- style="background:#FFFFE0" 
|1||align=left| Naomh Abán ||3||3||0||0||4-29||2-17||18||6
|-  
|2||align=left| Glanworth ||3||2||0||1||6-25||4-26||5||4 
|-
|3||align=left| Bantry Blues ||3||1||0||2||5-27||5-20||7||2
|-
|4||align=left| Na Piarsaigh ||3||0||0||3||5-13||9-31||-30||0
|-|align=left|
|colspan="10" style="border:0px;font-size:85%;"| Yellow background The first-placed team qualified for the quarter-final stage of the championship proper.
|}

Results

Division 4

Quarter-finals

Semi-finals

Final

Championship statistics

Top scorers

Overall

Miscellaneous

 Nemo Rangers officials refused to allow team captain Brian Murphy to receive the cup in protest against the County Board's earlier decision to expel the Nemo Rangers senior hurling team from the 1978 Cork SHC and fine the club £75.
 St. Michael's become the first team since Fermoy between 1942-44 to lose three finals in a row.

References

Cork Senior Football Championship